Major League Lacrosse (MLL) was a professional men's field lacrosse league consisting of nine teams in the United States. Since the league's first season in 2001, the MLL gave several annual awards to players and coaches.

Most Valuable Player

Offensive Player of the Year

Defensive Player of the Year

Goaltender of the Year

Rookie of the Year

Coach of the Year

Man of the Year Award 

Named in honor of David Huntley , the former MLL coach for the Atlanta Blaze, Hamilton Nationals, Toronto Nationals, and Chesapeake Bayhawks, who died in December 2017, the award will be presented to the lacrosse athlete who has demonstrated, “sportsmanship and professionalism that are beyond reproach” and who “makes selfless, meaningful contributions to Major League Lacrosse, the game of lacrosse, and to his community.”

Iron Lizard Award 

Major League Lacrosse's SoBe Iron Lizard Award was given to the player who most embodied the traits of toughness, tenacity and determination regardless of pain or injury during season. The award was discontinued after 2003.

Sportsman of the Year 

The Sportsman of the Year award was discontinued after 2011.

Most Improved Player of the Year 

Discontinued after 2017.

Community Service Award 

Major League Lacrosse's Starbucks Community Service Award. Awarded only in 2005.

References

 
Most valuable player awards